The Cirta steles are almost 1,000 Punic funerary steles found in Cirta (today Constantine, Algeria) in a cemetery located on a hill immediately south of the Salah Bey Viaduct.

The first group of steles were published by Auguste Celestin Judas in 1861. The Lazare Costa inscriptions were the second group of these inscriptions found; they were discovered between 1875 and 1880 by Lazare Costa, a Constantine-based Italian antiquarian. Most of the steles are now in the Louvre. These are known as KAI 102–105.

In 1950, hundreds of additional steles were excavated from the same location – then named El Hofra – by André Berthier, director of the Gustave-Mercier Museum (today the Musée national Cirta) and Father René Charlier, professor at the Constantine seminary. Many of these steles are now in the Musée national Cirta. Over a dozen of the most notable inscriptions were later published in Kanaanäische und Aramäische Inschriften and are known as 106-116 (Punic) and 162-164 (Neo Punic).

Judas steles 

In 1861 Auguste Celestin Judas published a series of 19 inscribed steles in the Annuaire de la Société archéologique de la province de Constantine. Between 1857 and 61 more than 30 such steles had been collected by the Archaeological Society, of which a dozen in 1860 alone. Judas noted that the locations of the finds had been difficult to ascertain, his understanding was as follows:
Of the nineteen inscriptions of which I have spoken, two, nos. II and XVII, come from Coudiat-ati; sixteen from the location of the new Christian cemetery, to the west and 500 meters from Coudiat-ati, 725 meters from Constantine. For number I, no indication.

Costa steles

Overview 
On the death of Lazare Costa, Antoine Héron de Villefosse and Dr Reboud negotiated the acquisition of all of Costa's steles for the Louvre. Although not all the steles made it to the Louvre, more were found.

A concordance of 135 of the steles was published by Jean-Baptiste Chabot in 1917.

Gallery

Berthier steles

Overview 
At the southern exit of the city, on the El Hofra hill, about 150 m southeast of what was then the "Transatlantic Hotel" (today a branch of the Crédit populaire d'Algérie), the construction of a large Renault garage (today Garage Sonacome) was begun in spring 1950. The hill is at the confluence of the Rhumel River and its tributary Oued Bou Merzoug, just south of the Salah Bey Viaduct. On May 6, 1950, the excavator struck a mass of stelae grouped over a length of about 75 m, laid flat and forming a kind of wall whose height did not exceed the thickness of four stelae while the width varied from 0.5-1.0m.

The stelae were not found in situ: all appear to have been broken with intention (all were broken and many of the inscriptions were mutilated), and then transported to a sort of dumping ground.

By September 1950, about 500 fragments had been found, more than half of which bearing inscriptions; in total 700 stelae and fragments were found, of which 281 were Punic and neo-Punic stelae, totally or partially legible, 17 were Greek inscriptions and 7 were Latin inscriptions. Almost all the steles were published by Berthier and Charlier, except for three – one long Punic inscription which was too faint, and two Neo Punic inscriptions which were later published by James Germain Février (KAI 162–163).

Some are dated to the reign of Massinissa or the reign of her sons; they range from 163-2 BCE until 148-7 (the year of Massinissa's death) and perhaps until 122-1 (under Micipsa). Number 63 (KAI 112) mentions the simultaneous reign of the three sons of Massinissa – Micipsa, Gulussa and Mastanabai, and one of the stelae contains a complete transliteration of a Punic text in Greek characters (page 167).

Bibliography 
 BERTHIER André – CHARLIER René, 1952–55, Le sanctuaire punique d'El-Hofra à Constantine. 2 volumes
 
 Bertrandy François, Sznycer Maurice, Les Stèles puniques de Constantine, musée du Louvre, département des Antiquités orientales, Paris, Éditions de la Réunion des musées nationaux, 1987.

References

External sources 
 The Lazare Costa steles at the Louvre
 Photos of the Berthier steles

Punic inscriptions
Steles
Phoenician steles
KAI inscriptions
Archaeological artifacts